The Roman Catholic Diocese of Versailles (Latin: Dioecesis Versaliensis; French: Diocèse de Versailles) is a diocese of the Latin Church of the Roman Catholic Church, in France. The diocese, headed by the Bishop of Versailles, was established in 1801.  Until then, its territory had mostly been part of the Archdiocese of Paris and the Diocese of Chartres.  It was centred on Versailles.

History
On its creation, the territory of the diocese of Versailles corresponded to the département of Seine-et-Oise.  Following the boundary changes of the départements of Île-de-France, new dioceses were established on 9 October 1966.  The diocese of Versailles was therefore modified to correspond to the département of Yvelines, following the creation of the Dioceses of Évry–Corbeil-Essones, Nanterre, Saint-Denis, Créteil, Pontoise.

Bishops of Versailles
Louis Charrier de La Roche (1802–1827)
 Jean-François-Étienne Borderies (1827–1832)
 Louis-Marie-Edmond Blanquart de Bailleul (1832–1844)
 Jean-Nicaise Gros (1844–1857)
 Jean-Pierre Mabille (1858–1877)
 Pierre-Antoine-Paul Goux (1877–1904)
 Charles-Henri-Célestin Gibier (1906–1931)
 Benjamin-Octave Roland-Gosselin (1931–1952)
 Alexandre-Charles-Albert-Joseph Renard (1953–1967)
 Louis-Paul-Armand Simonneaux (1967–1988)
 Jean-Charles Thomas (1988–2001)
 Éric Aumonier (2001–2020)
 Lucien Crepy (2021–present)

The native bishops of Versailles
 Thierry Jordan, archbishop of Reims
 Stanislas Lalanne, bishop of Coutances et Avranches
Olivier de Berranger, bishop of Saint-Denis
 Pascal Roland, bishop of Moulins
 Albert Malbois, bishop emeritus of Évry

References

Sources

External links
 
  Centre national des Archives de l'Église de France, L’Épiscopat francais depuis 1919, retrieved: 2016-12-24.
 Official site of the diocese
 Diocese on catholic-hierarchy.org

 
Versailles
Versailles
Versailles
1801 establishments in France